Strigatella fasciolaris is a species of sea snail, a marine gastropod mollusk in the miter snail family. This species occurs in the Red Sea.

References

External links
 Deshayes G.P. 1834. [Coquilles de la Mer Rouge] pl. 65, p. 66 in: Laborde E.J. & Linant M.A., Voyage de l'Arabie Pétrée. Giard, Paris. 87 pp, 69 pl., 2 maps.

Mitridae
Gastropods described in 1834